Oleksandrivka is an urban-type settlement in Donetsk Oblast (province), located in the industrial region of the Donets basin. It is currently located in Kramatorsk Raion, but was formerly the administrative seat of Oleksandrivka Raion before the raion's abolition in 2020. Population:

History 

A local newspaper is published here since March 1933.

In January 1989 the population of the settlement was 4827 people.

In January 2013 the population of the city was 3688 people.

References

External links
 
 Oleksandrivka at the Ukrainian Soviet Encyclopedia

Urban-type settlements in Kramatorsk Raion